Emily Muskett (born Emily Godley  in Farnborough) is a retired  British weightlifter, competing in the 69, 71 and 75 kg categories and representing England and Great Britain at international competitions. She won a gold medal at the 2018 Commonwealth Games in the women 75 kg category, a gold at the 2019 Commonwealth Championships at 76 kg and a silver medal in the 71 kg category at the 2019 European Weightlifting Championships. She has competed in three world championships, including at the 2019 World Weightlifting Championships where she won her only global medal, a minor bronze medalist in the 'clean & jerk'.

Her coach is Andrew Callard. In August 2021, having finished 7th in the Olympic Games, Muskett announced her retirement, and transition to coaching.

Major results

References

External links
 
 Emily Godley at British Weight Lifting
 
 

1989 births
Living people
British female weightlifters
English female weightlifters
Weightlifters at the 2014 Commonwealth Games
Weightlifters at the 2010 Commonwealth Games
Weightlifters at the 2018 Commonwealth Games
Commonwealth Games medallists in weightlifting
Commonwealth Games gold medallists for England
European Weightlifting Championships medalists
World Weightlifting Championships medalists
Weightlifters at the 2020 Summer Olympics
Olympic weightlifters of Great Britain
Medallists at the 2018 Commonwealth Games